is a horse racing course located in Fukushima, Fukushima. It was built in 1918.

Courses
Fukushima Racecourse has both a turf and a dirt course.

The turf course measures 1600m. Races can be run on the "A Course" rail setting (on the hedge), the "B Course" setting (rail out 2 meters), or the "C Course" setting (rail out 4 meters).

The dirt course measures 1444.6 meters.

Notable races 

Horse racing venues in Japan
Sports venues in Fukushima Prefecture
Fukushima (city)
Sports venues completed in 1918
1918 establishments in Japan